Petalophthalmidae is a family of marine crustaceans in the order Mysida, the opossum shrimps.

Characteristics
Petalophthalmidans are distinguished from other mysids by the fact that the first pereopod (walking leg) does not have an exopod (outer branch), the carpopropodus of the endopod (inner branch) of the 3rd to 8th pereopods are not fused and there is no statocyst on the endopod of the uropods (posterior appendage). Female petalophthalmidans have seven oostegites (flexible bristly flaps) forming the base of the marsupium or brood pouch under the thorax. Most species in this genus are bathypelagic and live on or near the seabed in the deep ocean.

Genera
The following genera are recognised in the World Register of Marine Species:
Genus Bacescomysis Murano & Krygier, 1985
Genus Ceratomysis Faxon, 1893
Genus Hansenomysis Stebbing, 1893
Genus Parapetalophthalmus Murano & Bravo, 1998
Genus Petalophthalmus Willemoes-Suhm, 1875
Genus Pseudopetalophthalmus Bravo & Murano, 1997

References

Mysida
Crustacean families